Valeriy Valeryevich Zyuganov (born 31 July 1955 in Yangiyo‘l city, (Uzbekistan) is a Soviet and Russian biologist, (zoologist) and Doctor of Biological Sciences. He is the pupil and follower of professors V.V. Khlebovich,the Zoological Institute of the Russian Academy of Sciences and Yu. A. Labas. A.N. Severtsov Institute of Ecology and Evolution of the Russian Academy of Sciences

Career
Valeriy Zyuganov graduated from the Faculty of Biology, Moscow State University in 1977.

Since 1977 Valeriy Zyuganov has been a researcher (graduate employee) at the  Koltzov institute of developmental biology of Russian Academy of Sciences in (Moscow).

Since 1980, he has been a candidate of biological sciences. At Moscow State University, he presented a thesis on the topic: - "Mechanisms of formation of complex of Gasterosteus aculeatus sensu lato". After presenting his doctoral dissertation, he was appointed a junior researcher in the Koltzov institute of developmental biology of Russian Academy of Sciences in Moscow.

Since 1985, he has been a research fellow in the Koltzov institute of developmental biology of Russian Academy of Sciences in Moscow.

In 1989 he received the commission of chief scientific worker.

In 1994, Valeriy Zyuganov became a Doctor of Biological Sciences. At the St. Petersburg State University in Saint Petersburg, his doctoral thesis and scientific paper are on the specialty 03.00.10 — ichthyology on the theme: - " The family of stickleback (Gasterosteidae) in the world's fauna."

Since 2005, Valery Zyuganov is the head of the group of ecology and biological systems evolution in the Koltzov institute of developmental biology of Russian Academy of Sciences in Moscow.

Scientific achievements
In the late 1980s and early 1990s, V.V. Zyuganov formulated the concept of freshwater pearl mussel–—Atlantic salmon symbiosis.

In the 1990s, V.V. Zyuganov and colleagues developed a number of biotechnologies for breeding rare and endangered species of freshwater mussels of a genus of Margaritifera, which are included in the IUCN Red List of the USSR. These inventions  are protected  inventor's certificates.

In the 1990s, V.V. Zyuganov, in the framework of the concept: - a freshwater pearl mussel - Atlantic salmon symbiosis, put forward the parasite-gooder hypothesis, which prolongs the life-span of the host. This hypothesis is supported by a number of known researchers. The debate has moved beyond the scientific community of Russia.  The Zyuganov hypothesis was discussed at international conferences and was cited in scholarly journals and monographs of known researchers.
 The tone of the debate was relented after having been discovered similar facts of a life extension of a host by means of parasite in pairs: - parasitic worms -  fish and crustacean - fish. For the Zyuganov hypothesis  were   appeared credible proponents
and opponents

V.V. Zyuganov received worldwide reputation after he discovered the fact of a negligible senescence and determined the maximum lifespan (210–250 years) of the freshwater pearl mussel (Margaritifera margaritifera). The data of V.V. Zyuganov have been confirmed by the Finnish malacologists and gained general acceptance. In general, the V.V. Zyuganov is the author of 120 scientific papers, 6 monographs, and patents.

Zyuganov is known as the author of  antineoplastic drugs "Elixir Arctic +" and as the author of publications in popular scientific literature about human aging.

Zyuganov is the president of the international "Society Conservation Margaritiferidae" (SCM). A new society was formed at the Twelfth International Malacological Congress in Vigo, Spain in September 1995 to promote the conservation and management of margaritiferid species around the world. The freshwater pearlshells of the family Margaritiferidae include 25 nominal genera that inhabit rivers of North America and Eurasia, with some species and many populations in imminent danger of extinction or extirpation, respectively. The SCM was formed by a multinational cadre of scientists for the purpose of coordinating international efforts for research, management, and the protection of habitats critical to these species. One of the long-term goals of SCM is to create an international monograph on the systematics, distribution, ecology, and status of margaritiferids globally.

Since 1992, V.V. Zyuganov is supervisor the Salmon wildlife preserve of Varzuga.

V.V. Zyuganov was repeatedly elected a member and chairman of the Far East of the Ministry of Natural Resources of Russia, which examines allowable catches of Pacific salmon.

Scientific activity
Zyuganov studied the evolution of marine and freshwater fauna, ecological and physiological basis of animal and human longevity. He was the supervisor and member of environmental projects in Russia, Germany, Spain, France, Britain, Norway and Sweden. Zyuganov investigated non-aging aquatic organisms in the laboratory and in 70 expeditions in Russia, the United States, 20 countries in Europe, Africa, and Southeast Asia on the coast of the Pacific and Indian oceans.
Recently, Zyuganov has focused on studying the negligible senescence phenomenon. He shows himself as an apologist of the astrocytic hypothesis of aging of mammals in polemics with opponents.

Partial bibliography

In English

In Russian
Зюганов В.В., Лабас Ю.А., Хлебович В.В. 1987. Ионные каналы,  гены  и    эволюция // Природа. N 9.   C. 92-99

Зюганов В.В., Зотин А.А. 2001. Обыкновенная жемчужница Margaritifera margaritifera - Красная Книга Российской Федерации. Животные. С. 61–69.  АСТ. Астрель.
 Зюганов В. В. 2009. Жемчужные симбиозы в Акртике и в тропиках // Нептун № 5. С. 96 - 100.

See also
Atlantic salmon
Freshwater pearl mussel
Negligible senescence
Symbiosis

References

External links
Full bibliography
Leivrus Arctica (a web site)
Unio Gallery: Epioblasma - "fish snappers" (video clips)

Russian biologists
Russian gerontologists
1955 births
Living people
Moscow State University alumni
Soviet biologists